Gurino is a rural locality (a village) in Dobryansky District, Perm Krai, Russia. The population was 8 as of 2010. There are 2 streets.

Geography 
Gurino is located 52 km northwest of Dobryanka (the district's administrative centre) by road. Yaganyata is the nearest rural locality.

References 

Rural localities in Dobryansky District